Largie Castle may refer to any of several places in Scotland:

 Largie Castle, Rhunahaorine
 Largie Castle, Tayinloan